Batman: Original Motion Picture Score is the score album for the 1989 film Batman by Danny Elfman. According to the Batman DVD Special Edition, Elfman said that producer Jon Peters was not sure about him as a composer until Tim Burton made him play the main titles. Elfman admitted he was stunned when Peters announced that the score would be released on its own album. The score was widely acclaimed by the press and in many contemporary reviews is cited as the highlight of the film.

Elfman's "The Batman Theme" went on to become an iconic piece. It served as the basis for the theme music and played in some episodes of Batman: The Animated Series, which premiered in 1992, although this was later changed. Some parts of the Elfman score are also heard in Static Shock, Lego Batman: The Videogame, Lego Batman 2: DC Super Heroes, Lego Batman 3: Beyond Gotham, the 1989 Batmobile DLC for Batman: Arkham Knight, the 2017 Justice League film (which was also composed by Elfman), and the Arrowverse crossover Crisis on Infinite Earths. Parts are also played in the queue and on the station platform of Batman the Ride at various Six Flags theme parks.

Production 
Burton hired Danny to compose the music score for Batman. For inspiration, Elfman was given The Dark Knight Returns. Elfman was worried, as he had never worked on a production this large in budget and scale. In an interview with Keyboard in October 1989, Elfman said that he never read Batman as a child, preferring Marvel heroes such as Spider-Man and the Fantastic Four. In addition, producer Jon Peters was skeptical of hiring Elfman, but was later convinced when he heard the opening number. Peters and Peter Guber wanted Prince to write music for the Joker and Michael Jackson to do the romance songs. Elfman would then combine the style of Prince and Jackson's songs together for the entire film score.

Burton protested the ideas, citing "my movies aren't commercial like Top Gun". Elfman enlisted the help of Oingo Boingo lead guitarist Steve Bartek and Shirley Walker to arrange the compositions for the orchestra. Elfman was later displeased with the audio mixing of his film score. According to Elfman: "Batman was done in England by technicians who didn't care, and the non-caring showed. I'm not putting down England because they've done gorgeous dubs there, but this particular crew elected not to". Despite it, Elfman included several synthesizer cues in the film, mostly percussion samples. Elfman based his five-note Batman motif on his viewing experience on the rough cut of the film.

In rearranging Stephen Foster's "Beautiful Dreamer", Elfman added a "lovely climax" as the Joker twirls away. Elfman also recorded the composition twice, primarily on the violin. Meanwhile, in recording "Up the Cathedral", Elfman did not use a real church organ, but an electronic organ by Rodgers Instruments. Elfman cites his inspiration for "Up the Cathedral" to Bernard Herrmann's score for the 1961 film Mysterious Island, a film he enjoyed as a child. Elfman completed his score on May 15, 1989, just over a month before the film's release.

Track listing 

Additional music credited

Complete score 
La-La Land Records released Danny Elfman's complete score to Batman on July 27, 2010.

Disc One: Original Score (film version)

Disc Two: Original Soundtrack Album (remastered)(tracks 22-29 are bonus cues)

(*) Previously unreleased
(**) includes "Scandalous!" composed by Prince with John L. Nelson
(***) includes "Beautiful Dreamer" composed by Stephen Foster

Chart positions

References 

1989 soundtrack albums
Batman (1989 film series)
Batman film soundtracks
Danny Elfman soundtracks
Film scores
Warner Records soundtracks